Loraine may refer to:

People
Loraine (name)

Places
 Loraine, California
 Loraine, Illinois
 Loraine, North Dakota
 Loraine, Texas
 Loraine Township, Henry County, Illinois

Buildings
Hotel Loraine, Wisconsin, United States
Loraine Building, Michigan, United States

Other uses
 Loraine, a song by Linton Kwesi Johnson from the album Bass Culture
Loraine baronets, English baronetage

See also

 Lorain (disambiguation)
Lorane (disambiguation)
 Lorrain (disambiguation)
 Lorraine (disambiguation)
 Lorraine (given name)